Josh Corbett (born 23 April 1996) is a professional Australian rules footballer playing for the Fremantle Football Club in the Australian Football League (AFL), having initially been signed by the Gold Coast Suns.

Early life
Corbett was raised in the regional Victorian town of Warrnambool and grew up playing football for the North Warrnambool Eagles in the Hampden Football League. As a teenager, he was overlooked by his region's TAC Cup team North Ballarat but continued to make his way through the local levels of football in Warrnambool. After finishing second in North Warrnambool's 2015 senior best and fairest award at the age of 19, Corbett was invited to take part in preseason training with the Werribee Tigers and impressed enough to be signed prior to the commencement of the 2016 VFL season. He gradually adjusted to the higher standard of competition by improving his fitness and made his senior VFL debut for Werribee in August 2016. By early 2018, Corbett had cemented his place in Werribee's forward line and strung together nine consecutive games in which he kicked 22 goals. He also led the VFL in contested marks and marks inside 50. His outstanding start to the season came to a halt in round 12 when an errant poke to his left eye from a Frankston opponent obstructed his vision and resulted in a blood clot forming in his iris and pupil. He went temporarily blind in his left eye for a month due to the incident and was unable to return for the rest of the 2018 season. Despite only playing half a season, Corbett was awarded the Fothergill–Round–Mitchell Medal as the VFL's most promising young player. During his time with Werribee, he was personally sponsored by former Australian Prime Minister Julia Gillard.

In October 2018, the Gold Coast Suns signed Corbett to a four-year AFL contract with the use of the special assistance state league priority access granted by the AFL.

AFL career
Corbett made his AFL debut for Gold Coast against the Brisbane Lions in round 6 of the 2019 AFL season and kicked two goals in his first game.

Statistics
 Statistics are correct to the end of round 3, 2022

|-
|- style="background-color: #EAEAEA"
! scope="row" style="text-align:center" | 2019
|style="text-align:center;"|
| 19 || 9 || 3 || 8 || 50 || 31 || 81 || 40 || 14 || 0.3 || 0.9 || 5.6 || 3.4 || 9.0 || 4.4 || 1.6 || 0
|-
! scope="row" style="text-align:center" | 2020
|style="text-align:center;"|
| 19 || 7 || 3 || 6 || 45 || 17 || 62 || 31 || 7 || 0.4 || 0.9 || 6.4 || 2.4 || 8.9 || 4.4 || 1.0 || 0
|- style="background-color: #EAEAEA"
! scope="row" style="text-align:center" | 2021
|style="text-align:center;"|
| 19 || 16 || 23 || 11 || 101 || 41 || 142 || 78 || 12 || 1.4 || 0.7 || 6.3 || 2.6 || 8.9 || 4.9 || 0.8 || 1
|-
! scope="row" style="text-align:center" | 2022
|style="text-align:center;"|
| 19 || 1 || 0 || 0 || 0 || 0 || 0 || 0 || 0 || 0.0 || 0.0 || 0.0 || 0.0 || 0.0 || 0.0 || 0.0 || TBA
|-
|- class="sortbottom"
! colspan=3| Career
! 33
! 29
! 25
! 196
! 89
! 285
! 149
! 33
! 0.9
! 0.8
! 5.9
! 2.7
! 8.6
! 4.5
! 1.0
! 1
|}

Notes

References

External links

1996 births
Living people
Werribee Football Club players
Gold Coast Football Club players
Australian rules footballers from Victoria (Australia)